Jeo Baby  is an Indian film director, scriptwriter and actor who works in the Malayalam film industry. His family drama film The Great Indian Kitchen won 51st Kerala state film award for best film and he bagged best screenplay award.

Early life
Jeo Baby was born in a Christian family in Thalanad near Pala. He studied cinema at St. Joseph College of Communication, Changanacherry. During his student days, he directed the short film Secret Minds which discussed same-sex relationships. The short film became controversial following which Jeo Baby and four other students were expelled from the college.

Career 
Jeo Baby started his career in the entertainment industry by writing for Television sitcoms in 2010. He was involved in scripting the initial episodes of popular television sitcoms Marimayam, 'Uppum Mulakum' and 'M80 Moosa'. He made his directional movie debut through the Malayalam movie '2 Penkuttikal' which was released in 2016. His second movie Kunju Daivam was released in 2017. In 2020 he directed Kilometers and Kilometers which has Tovino Thomas playing the lead role. The movie didn't get a theatrical release due to COVID-19 pandemic & premiered directly on Malayalam satellite channel Asianet followed by an OTT release on Netflix. His fourth Malayalam film, The Great Indian Kitchen, which has Suraj Venjaramoodu & Nimisha Sajayan playing the lead roles, was directly released on 'NeeStream' OTT platform on 15 January 2021. The movie was later officially released on Amazon Prime.

His next film, with Jyothika and Mammootty, is titled Kaathal-The core.

Short Film

Television

Sitcoms

Filmography

Feature films 
 As director

As Actor
Jeo baby has done short roles in various Malayalam feature films.

 Ain (2015)
 Kunju Daivam (2018) 
 Edakkad Battalion 06 (2019)
Kilometers and Kilometers (2020)
Varthamanam(2021)
Kho Kho (2021)
  Freedom Fight (2022)
Sreedhanya Catering Service (2022)
Chera (2022)

References

External links

Living people
Film directors from Kerala
Malayalam film directors
Malayalam screenwriters
Screenwriters from Kerala
Year of birth missing (living people)